George Wilson, also known by the nickname of "Happy", was a Scottish rugby union and professional rugby league footballer who played in the 1940s and 1950s.

Playing career

International honours
Wilson won caps for South of Scotland (RU) while at Kelso RFC 1947 3-caps, won caps for Other Nationalities (RL) while at Workington ?-caps, and won caps for Great Britain (RL) while at Workington in 1951 against New Zealand (3 matches).

Challenge Cup Final appearances
Wilson played  and scored a try in Workington Town's 18-10 victory over Featherstone Rovers in the 1951–52 Challenge Cup Final  at Wembley Stadium, London on Saturday 19 April 1952, in front of a crowd of 72,093.

References

External links
(archived by web.archive.org) Britain hold out Kiwis at Odsal
(archived by archive.is) When League was the new TV game
A roller-coaster ride – from winners to amateur victims

Great Britain national rugby league team players
Kelso RFC players
Living people
Other Nationalities rugby league team players
Place of birth missing (living people)
Place of death missing
Rugby league players from Scottish Borders
Rugby league wingers
Rugby union players from Scottish Borders
Rugby union wings
Scottish rugby league players
Scottish rugby union players
South of Scotland District (rugby union) players
Workington Town players
Year of birth missing (living people)
Year of death missing